Ichthyokentema ("fish-goad") is an extinct genus of stem-teleost fish that lived during the Late Jurassic. It contains one species, I. purbeckensis, which is known from the Purbeck Group of Dorset, England. I. purbeckensis was originally described as a species of Pholidophorus by William Davies in 1887, but was moved to its own genus by Arthur Smith Woodward in 1941.

See also

 List of prehistoric bony fish genera

References

Prehistoric ray-finned fish genera
Tithonian life
Late Jurassic bony fish
Late Jurassic fish of Europe
Jurassic England
Fossils of England
Fossil taxa described in 1941
Taxa named by Arthur Smith Woodward